Eslamabad (also romanized as Eslāmābād) is a village in Tarrud Rural District, in the Central District of Damavand County, Tehran Province, Iran. At the 2006 census, its population was 457, in 114 families.

References 

Populated places in Damavand County